Van Hung is a cargo vessel, registered in Vietnam. The container ship delivers cargo around the coast of Vietnam, mainly between the cities of Ho Chi Minh City and Da Nang.

Description

References

Cargo ships
Ships of Vietnam
1996 ships